Boykin is an unincorporated community and census-designated place (CDP) in Miller County, Georgia, United States. As of the 2020 census it had a population of 151.

History
The community most likely was named after Guilford A. Boyken, Sr., an early settler. A post office called Boykin was established in 1897 and remained in operation until 1932.

The Georgia General Assembly incorporated the place as the "Town of Boykin" in 1903. The town's charter was dissolved in 1995.

Geography
The CDP is bordered to the south by Big Drain, which flows west to Spring Creek, which continues south to Lake Seminole near the confluence of the Flint and Chattahoochee rivers to form the Apalachicola River.

References

Former municipalities in Georgia (U.S. state)
Census-designated places in Miller County, Georgia
Census-designated places in Georgia (U.S. state)
Unincorporated communities in Miller County, Georgia
Unincorporated communities in Georgia (U.S. state)
Populated places disestablished in 1995